Nader is a masculine given name and surname of Arabic origin ( Nādir, meaning "rare", "unique") and may refer to:

Persons

Given name

 Nader Shah, former Shah of Iran (Persia)
 Nader Ahmadi (born 1986), Iranian football player
 Nader Batmanghelidj (1904–1998), Iranian army general
 Nader al-Dahabi (born 1946), Jordanian politician
 Nader Darehshori, businessman in the United States
 Nader Engheta, Iranian scientist and engineer
 Wael Nader al-Halqi, Syrian politician
 Nader Jahanbani, Iranian army officer
 Nader Matar, Lebanese footballer
 Nader El-Sayed, Egyptian footballer

Surname
 Abdel Nader, Egyptian-American basketball player
 Alireza Nader, American academic
 Claire Nader, American social scientist
 George Nader, Arab-American actor and uncle of Michael Nader
 George Nader, Lebanese-American businessman, lobbyist, and convicted sex offender
 Habib Nasib Nader (born 1979), British actor
 Hassan Nader, retired Moroccan football player
 Laura Nader, American professor of anthropology
 Michael Nader, American actor
 Ralph Nader, American attorney, citizen activist and four time third-party presidential candidate
 Rose Nader, American social activist and mother of Ralph Nader
 Shafeek Nader, community advocate and brother of Ralph Nader

Other uses
 Nader, an Arabic word used in Hadith evaluation, which can be translated to mean "rare" or "unique"
 (also Näder): German surname, meaning embroiderer or tailor
 A slang term for tornadoes

See also
 Nadir (disambiguation)
 Nadir (name)
 Nater (disambiguation), includes a list of people with surname Nater

References

Arabic-language surnames
Arabic masculine given names

German-language surnames
Occupational surnames